An automated information system (AIS) is an assembly of computer hardware, software, firmware, or any combination of these, configured to accomplish specific information-handling operations, such as communication, computation, dissemination, processing, and storage of information. Included are computers, word processing systems, networks, or other electronic information handling systems, and associated equipment. Management information systems are a common example of automated information systems.

An example of this is an industrial robot.

Also an Automated Information System (AIS) refers to any piece of equipment or interconnected system of equipment utilized in the automated collection, storage, manipulation, management, movement, control, display, switching, interchange, transmission, or receiving of data, and includes computer software, firmware, and hardware. Computers, word processing systems, networks, or other electronic information handling systems, as well as accompanying equipment, are included.

Importance of AIS 
The usage of an automated information system, also known as an automated information management system, may be extremely beneficial to both government agencies and commercial businesses. The practice of swiftly distributing information via an automated system can save several hours of tiresome labor, resulting in a cost savings for the organization in need of that information. This sort of technology may do everything from remind individuals when their bills are due to notifying them about a potentially dangerous scenario.

Federal Standard 1037C 
 National Information Assurance Glossary

References

Information systems

ru:Автоматизированная информационная система